Benzquinamide is a discontinued antiemetic drug used in post-operative care. It was first synthesised by Pfizer in the 1960s.

References

Antiemetics
Antipsychotics
Acetate esters
Catechol ethers